The 2019 Somali First Division is the 46th season of the Somali First Division, the top-tier football league in Somalia. The season started on 7 February 2019.

Standings
Final table.

References

External links
Somali Football Federation

Somalia
Football leagues in Somalia
Football